Vasile Coroş (born 14 June 1951) is a Romanian speed skater. He competed in two events at the 1980 Winter Olympics.

References

1951 births
Living people
Romanian male speed skaters
Olympic speed skaters of Romania
Speed skaters at the 1980 Winter Olympics
Sportspeople from Târgu Mureș